The following are known by the epithet the Strict:

 Bolko I the Strict (1252/56-1301), Duke of Lwówek, of Jawor, and of Świdnica-Ziębice
 Otto II, Duke of Brunswick-Lüneburg (c. 1266–1330), also Prince of Lüneburg

See also
Oda of Canterbury (died 958), Archbishop of Canterbury called the Severe

Lists of people by epithet